Lodovica Comello (born 13 April 1990) is an Italian actress, television presenter, singer and dancer who gained international popularity for her role as "Francesca" in the Argentine Disney Channel series Violetta.

Early life
Comello was born and raised in San Daniele del Friuli near Udine in Friuli. She demonstrated her passion for art, acting, dance, guitar from a very young age. She started guitar lessons at age 8. In high school, she studied music theory and participated in dance and acting in her spare time. She attended I.S.I.S. Superiore Vincenzo Manzini, a public high school in San Daniele del Friuli. During her time at school, she won a science writing contest and was awarded a trip to Austria. She graduated high school in 2008. After completing her high school studies, she auditioned for and later took courses in music at M.A.S.: Music Arts & Show, a drama school in Milan, Italy in 2009. She attended M.A.S. from 2009 to 2011. In 2009, she was cast as a performer for the "Il Mondo di Patty" tour, the Italian version of the widely successful Argentine children's program, Patito Feo. The tour held concerts in Italy and Spain. She also appeared as a backup vocalist for Brenda Asnicar's special section of the same tour in Italy.

Acting career
While living in Milan and attending M.A.S., she learned of a Disney Channel Latin America casting search for Italian actors, who also spoke Spanish. Although she spoke little Spanish, Comello memorized and performed a short monologue in Spanish for her audition. One week after auditioning, she successfully obtained a role on Violetta, the network's latest tween musical television series. In 2011, Lodovica was announced as "Francesca", the best friend and classmate of the title character in the show. Filming for the program required Comello to move to Buenos Aires in mid-2011. Once cast in the series, Comello learned Spanish.

In November 2012, she filmed the second season of Violetta in Buenos Aires and Barcelona, Spain. It premiered on 29 April 2013. That same year, she provided the Italian voiceover for "Britney" in Monster's University.
Comello returned to film the third and final season of "Violetta" which began production in Buenos Aires in March 2014 and ended in late November of that same year. The third season began airing in Argentina on 28 July 2014. The series finale aired in Latin America on 6 February 2015.

In late August 2016, Comello was revealed as a cast member in the Italian comedy film Poveri ma ricchi ("Poor but rich" in English). The movie filmed in Rome and Milan and was released in Italian cinemas on 15 December 2016. The role is Comello's cinema debut and first live action acting role since the completion of Violetta.

Music career

2013–2015: Universo and Mariposa
On 1 November 2013, Comello released "Universo" ("Universe" in English), the lead single from her debut album of the same name; the album was later released on 19 November 2013 in Italy, Spain and Argentina. The album features nine tracks co-written by Comello and one English-language cover of I Only Want to Be with You. Comello recorded acoustic versions of the title track, "Universo" in Spanish and Italian. The album's second single was "Otro día más". The music video was filmed in Barcelona, Spain and premiered on her official YouTube channel in March 2014.

In May 2014, Comello announced plans to embark on a world tour in 2015. A special website was created to allow fans to vote on various international cities for possible concert locations in Latin America, Europe, Israel, and the United States. The music video for her third single, "I Only Want To Be With You" premiered on her official VEVO channel on 5 September 2014.

In 2014, Comello began writing songs for her second album during breaks on the set while filming of the final season of Violetta in Buenos Aires. She recorded material in Buenos Aires on the weekends when the show was not filming. On 24 January 2015, Comello announced to fans via her official Twitter account that her second album, Mariposa ("Butterfly"), would be released on 3 February 2015 in Italy. The album was subsequently released on iTunes for Europe and Latin America a few weeks later. The album contains 12 songs in Spanish, Italian and English. She co-wrote most of the album's songs with the exception of "Un posto libero", "We Are Family" and "Crazy Love". The album's deluxe edition contains five Italian-language translations of some of the album's original Spanish songs. Comello skipped the 2015 world tour with the cast of Violetta to focus on promoting her material as a solo artist. Her world tour began in Rome with two sold-out shows on 1 February 2015. She toured throughout Italy from February until mid-March, and then in June, July and October. The tour included shows in Spain, Belgium, Poland, Portugal, and France.

The album's lead single, "Todo El Resto No Cuenta", was released on iTunes on 30 January 2015. The single's music video premiered one day later. The album debuted at No. 13 on the Italian Album charts. Mariposas second single,"Sin usar palabras", features Spanish singer Abraham Mateo. Comello also released a Polish version of "Sin usar palabras" featuring Szymon Chodyniecki. Her world tour to support the release of Mariposa ended on 25 October 2015 in Naples, Italy.

2016–present: New music

On 13 May 2016, Comello released the Italian-language song "Non cadiamo mai" ("Never Fall" in English) as the lead single from her upcoming untitled third studio album. The release of the single conceded with the season 4 finale of "Italia's Got Talent", which aired that same night in Italy. Comello co-wrote the song, and a Spanish-language version is expected to be released. The music video for the single premiered one day prior on her official VEVO channel.

On 12 December 2016, it was confirmed by festival organizers that Comello would be taking part in the 2017 edition of the Sanremo Music Festival, considered the greatest music festival in Italy.  The winner of the festival is offered a chance to represent Italy in Eurovision. She participated with the song, Il cielo non-mi basta. The Sanremo Music Festival was held from 7 to 11 February 2017.  Comello finished in 12th place out of 16 finalists. Directed by her husband, the official music video for Il cielo non-mi basta, was released on her official VEVO account in Italy on 8 February 2017. The song peaked at 37 on the Italian FIMI Singles Chart, becoming the first single of her music career to enter on the chart. On 5 May 2017, she released her second single, "50 Shades of Colours", from her upcoming third studio album. The music video, filmed in Rome, was premiered as an exclusive for Corriere della Sera, the Milan-based newspaper.  Comello performed three concerts in Rome on 19 May, in Milan on 26 May, and in Udine on 21 July to promote her new music.

Other ventures
On 2 April 2015, Comello released her autobiography, Tutto il resto non-conta: la musica, Buenos Aires, e un pollo al curry con chi dico io, in Italy; she wrote the book while living in Buenos Aires during the filming of Violettas final season: to promote the book, Comello embarked on several book signings throughout Italy in April 2015; the book was later translated into Polish, and she held a signing in Warsaw on 9 May 2015.

In September 2015, Comello was announced as the new host for the 7th season of Italia's Got Talent. Auditions began in Milan in late 2015; the 7th season of Italia's Got Talent premiered on 16 March 2016 on Sky Uno, where it aired weeknights. The finale was held in Rome and aired live on 13 May 2016 for the Italian network, TV8. Comello is the host of the new music themed game show, "Singing in the Car", which premiered on 5 September 2016 in Italy on the network, TV8.

Comello is the host of the children's talent show, "Kid's Got Talent", the spin-off of "Italia's Got Talent". The show premiered on 18 December 2016 on TV8 in Italy.

Personal life
Comello has one older sister named Ilaria. She speaks fluent Spanish, and English. She lived in Buenos Aires, settling in the Palermo neighborhood, for three years while working on Violetta. She moved back to Milan, Italy once production on the series ended in late November 2014. In 2012, Comello met Argentine television producer, Tomas Goldschmidt, on the set of Violetta. The couple dated for four years and later married in a small civil ceremony at the city hall in San Daniele del Friuli, Italy on 1 April 2015.

In November 2019, Comello announced to fans via Instagram that she and her husband were expecting their first child, a boy, in early spring. On 16 March 2020, her son, Teo Goldschmidt, was born in Milan.

Filmography

 Discography 
 Studio albums 

Soundtrack albums

SinglesAs main artist'

Promotional singles

Music videos

Tours

Headlining
 Lodovica World Tour (2015)
 #Noi2 Tour (2017)

Co-headlining
 Violetta en Vivo (2013–2014)

Supporting
Il Mondo di Patty (As backup singer and dancer) (2009–2010)
Antonella in Concerto (As backup singer and dancer) (2010)

Awards and nominations

References

External links

Living people
1990 births
People from San Daniele del Friuli
Italian actresses
Italian singers
Italian female dancers
Italian emigrants to Argentina
21st-century Italian singers
21st-century Italian women singers